Actinotus bellidioides, sometimes known as tiny flannel-flower, is an endemic Australian rosette herb. The species name comes from Bellis, a genus of Asteraceae and Greek oides, meaning "resembles". The name refers to the similarity of the leaves with the genus Bellis.

Description
Actinotus bellidioides is a small rosette herb typically found in button grass moors, and other waterlogged habitats. The leaves are hairy and dark green, sometimes with toothed margins.

References

bellidioides
Taxa named by George Bentham